Jeff Tate (born April 22, 1988) is an American politician. He is a Republican representing District 33 in the Mississippi State Senate.

Political career

Tate served as an Election Commissioner in Lauderdale County, Mississippi from 2009 to 2019.

In 2019, Tate ran for election to the 33rd district's seat in the Mississippi State Senate; former Senator Videt Carmichael had decided not to seek re-election. Tate defeated Erie Johnston in the Republican primary with 83.9% of the vote, and was unopposed in the general election.

Committee assignments
Tate serves on the following Senate committees:
 Elections (Chair)
 Appropriations
 County Affairs
 Environment Protection, Conservation and Water Resources
 Forestry
 Labor
 Local and Private
 Technology

References

Living people
Republican Party Mississippi state senators
1988 births
21st-century American politicians